In mathematics, a polyphase sequence is a sequence whose terms are complex roots of unity:

 

where xn is an integer.

Polyphase sequences are an important class of sequences and play important roles in synchronizing sequence design.

See also
Zadoff–Chu sequence

References

Sequences and series